Peechi Dam thrissur is situated  outside Thrissur city in Kerala, India. The dam was started as an irrigation project for the surrounding villages in Thrissur. At the same time, it catered the drinking water needs of the population of Thrissur City. It serves as an irrigation dam, reaching out to the paddy fields in and around Thrissur city. Elephants may be seen on the bank of Peechi-Vazhani Wildlife Sanctuary, established in 1958 covering .

History

E. Ikkanda Warrier (1890–1977), the first Prime Minister of the then independent state of Kochi, India, was the architect of Peechi Dam. Majority of the Thrissukkar opposed the dam cutting across the partyline. He brought a retired Chief Engineer from Andhra Pradesh to build the dam as engineers from Kerala opposed the project. The dam was completed in 1959. Burgula Ramakrishna Rao, first Kerala Governor on 4 October 1957 inaugurated the dam.

Statistics
 One of the oldest dams in Kerala
 Type of Dam: Concrete Straight Gravity

Education
 Mercy Convent LP School, Peechi
 Govt. LP School, Peechi
 Government Higher Secondary School, Peechi

See also
List of dams and reservoirs in India
Contractor: Mr N O Inasu, Nadakkavukaran. He is responsible for many other major projects in Kerala.

References

Contact Number: 04872698900

Dams completed in 1959
Dams in Thrissur district
1959 establishments in Kerala
20th-century architecture in India